Sarteliha (also Romanized as Sartelīhā; also known as Moḩammad ‘Alīābād) is a village in Abezhdan Rural District, Abezhdan District, Andika County, Khuzestan Province, Iran. At the 2006 census, its population was 155, in 23 families.

References 

Populated places in Andika County